Fındıklı is a village in the Borçka District, Artvin Province, Turkey. Its population is 251 (2021). Most villagers are ethnically Laz.

Name
The name of the village probably comes from the cultivation of hazelnuts (Turkish: fındık) in the area. According to a Turkish source, old name of the village is Saxandro.

Economy
The village's economy is based on agriculture, as well as hazelnut, tea, and fruit cultivation.

Muhtars
After being incorporated, the village has elected muhtars (head of the village) since 1984.
 2004 – Mustafa Eksilmez

Infrastructure
Fındıklı has an elementary school, but it is not in use; students are transported to another populated area for their education. The village has no drinking or tap water system, and it does not have a sewer network. The village does not have a postal service (PTT) branch, but it does have a PTT agent to carry mail in and out of the village. The main road leading into Fındıklı is paved, and the village has stable and reliable electricity and telephone service.

References

Villages in Borçka District
Laz settlements in Turkey